Triplophysa scleroptera is a species of ray-finned fish in the genus Triplophysa.

Footnotes 
 

S
Taxa named by Solomon Herzenstein
Fish described in 1888